1972 college football season may refer to:

 1972 NCAA University Division football season
 1972 NCAA College Division football season
 1972 NAIA Division I football season
 1972 NAIA Division II football season